Nystia is an extinct genus of fossil freshwater snails, aquatic gastropod molluscs in the family Truncatellidae.

The genus Nystia was previously classified within the Stenothyridae or the Micromelaniidae. It is currently classified within the Truncatellidae according to Kadolsky (1988).

Distribution 
The distribution of the genus Nystia includes France and the Czech Republic.

Species 
Species in the genus Nystia include:
 Nystia duchasteli (Nyst, 1836) - synonym: Paludina duchasteli Nyst, 1836, type species, from Eocene of France
 Nystia lenoiri
 Nystia rubeschi

References

Further reading 
 Klika B. (1891). 
 Schlickum W. R. (1970). "Zur Gattung Nystia Tounouer". Archiv für Molluskenkunde 100(5-6): 291–293.

Truncatellidae
Eocene gastropods